
Year 110 (CX) was a common year starting on Tuesday (link will display the full calendar) of the Julian calendar. In the Roman Empire, it was known as the Year of the Consulship of Priscinus and Scipio (or, less frequently, year 863 Ab urbe condita). The denomination 110 for this year has been used since the early medieval period, when the Anno Domini calendar era became the prevalent method in Europe for naming years.

Events 
 By place 

 Roman Empire 
 The Forum of Trajan is constructed in Rome, by the Syrian architect Apollodorus of Damascus.

 Asia 
 Caravans make regular departures from Luoyang with Chinese ginger, cassia (a type of cinnamon), and silk to be bartered in Central Asia for gold, silver, glassware, pottery, cloth, and intaglio gems from Rome.

 By topic 

 Art and Science 
 Suetonius, Roman historian, publishes Viris Illustribus ("On Famous Men" – in the field of literature).

Births 
Hegesippus of Nazarene, Christian chronicler and writer (d. 180)
Qiao Xuan (or Gongzu), Chinese official and chancellor (d. 184)

Deaths 
 Duan Xi, Chinese Protector General of the Western Regions 
 Pacorus II, ruler (King of Kings ) of the Parthian Empire

References